Events from the year 1704 in Canada.

Incumbents
French Monarch: Louis XIV
English, Scottish and Irish Monarch: Anne

Governors
Governor General of New France: Philippe de Rigaud Vaudreuil
Governor of Acadia: Jacques-François de Monbeton de Brouillan
Colonial Governor of Louisiana: Jean-Baptiste Le Moyne de Bienville
Governor of Plaisance: Daniel d'Auger de Subercase

Events
 French destroy the English settlement at Bonavista, Newfoundland.

Historical documents
Massachusetts governor gives details of French and Indigenous attacks planned for Connecticut River and Maine and his attack on Acadia.

Account of a Massachusetts boy abducted by French and Indigenous raiders.

Massachusetts correspondent on huge benefit France has from commercial ascendancy and number of seamen in its Newfoundland fishery.

During war with France, defending St. John's complicated by soldier disorder and desertions and limited support from outports.

References

 
Canada
04